The Academy for the Middle Years (AMY) Northwest Middle School, formerly the William Levering School, is an historic middle school which is located in the Roxborough neighborhood of Philadelphia, Pennsylvania. It is part of the School District of Philadelphia.

It was added to the National Register of Historic Places in 1988.

History and architectural features
The school consists of two distinct buildings. The original section was built between 1894 and 1896, and is a two-and-one-half-story, five-bay, stone building with a hipped roofhich was designed in the Colonial Revival style.

A three-story addition was built immediately to the south of the first building between 1928 and 1929. It is a brick and stone Art Deco-style building designed by Irwin T. Catharine. 

Both buildings were added to the National Register of Historic Places in 1988.

In 2012, the School Reform Commission of the Philadelphia School District closed it as an elementary school; it then reopened as a selective admission middle school, AMY Northwest.

References

External links

School buildings on the National Register of Historic Places in Philadelphia
Colonial Revival architecture in Pennsylvania
Art Deco architecture in Pennsylvania
School buildings completed in 1929
Roxborough, Philadelphia
School District of Philadelphia
Public middle schools in Pennsylvania
1894 establishments in Pennsylvania